Tim Roxborogh is a New Zealand media personality, travel-writer and music reviewer. He is co-host of The Weekend Collective on Newstalk ZB and the Trip Notes podcast by NZH Travel.

Early life
The youngest child of John & Jenny Roxborogh, a Presbyterian minister and English teacher respectively, Tim's parents moved their young family from New Zealand to Malaysia when he was only one and a half years old.

Career
Upon returning to New Zealand, while still in high school, Tim's knowledge of the Bee Gees enabled him to win a radio competition through Classic Hits. The prize included a meeting with the Bee Gees backstage on their 1999 tour to New Zealand. This opened the door at the age of 17 for his first on-air role in radio on a twice-weekly segment called 'Beat the Professor' talking music trivia with callers on Peter Sinclair's programme on Classic Hits.

Tim started filling in on the breakfast programme on Easy Listening i at the age of 24 and at 26 years old he landed the breakfast role full-time.

In 2012 Roxborogh was paired with Pam Corkery to create Newstalk ZB's Sunday night talkback programme The Two. When Pam departed Newstalk ZB in 2014 to work for The Internet Party, TVNZ journalist Tim Wilson joined Roxborogh on The Two.

In May 2018 Tim Roxborogh and Tim Wilson were moved to Saturday and Sunday afternoons from 3-6pm on Newstalk ZB, creating the new show The Weekend Collective. At the end of 2019 Tim Wilson moved to anchor Sunday nights with Tim Beveridge replacing him alongside Roxborogh on The Weekend Collective.

Family life 
Tim married Aimee Roxborogh in 2017. The couple met in high school and reconnected later in their thirties. In July 2019 they became parents to Riley.

References

Living people
Newstalk ZB
New Zealand radio presenters
Date of birth missing (living people)
1982 births